The Spell of the Yukon is a 1916 American silent American drama film directed by Burton L. King and starring Edmund Breese.

Cast 
 Edmund Breese as Jim Carson
 Arthur Hoops as Albert Temple
 Christine Mayo as Helen Temple
 William Sherwood as Bob Adams (as Billy Sherwood)
 Evelyn Brent as Dorothy Temple
 Frank McArthur as Megar
 Joseph S. Chailee as Rusty
 Jacques Suzanne as Billy Denny
 Mary Reed as Yukon Kate
 Harry Moreville as Ike Boring
 Lorna Volare as Bob Adams as a Baby (as Baby Volare)
 Claire Lillian Barry as Undetermined Role

References

External links 

1916 films
1916 drama films
Silent American drama films
American silent feature films
American black-and-white films
Films directed by Burton L. King
Films based on poems
Films based on works by Robert W. Service
Metro Pictures films
1910s American films
1910s English-language films